The Portfolio Committee on Agriculture, Land Reform and Rural Development is a portfolio committee of the South African National Assembly in the Parliament of South Africa. The committee is responsible for oversight of the Department of Agriculture, Land Reform and Rural Development (DALRRD) and associated entities, including the Agricultural Research Council, the National Agricultural Marketing Council, the  Perishable Products Export Control Board, the Onderstepoort Biological Products Limited, the Ingonyama Trust Board, the Registration of deeds trading account, the Agricultural landholdings account and the Office of the valuer-general.

Membership
Following the May 8, 2019 general election, the Rules Committee settled on 5 June 2019 that all parliament committees will consist of 11 Members: African National Congress – 6; Democratic Alliance – 2; Economic Freedom Fighters – 1; other parties – 2. Committees were established on 27 June and Mandla Mandela was elected chairperson of the Portfolio Committee on Agriculture, Land Reform and Rural Development on 2 July. The membership of the committee is as follows:

Additionally, the following people serve as alternate members:
Phineas Masipa MP (Democratic Alliance)
Simphiwe Mbatha MP (African National Congress)
Munzoor Shaik Emam MP (National Freedom Party)
Patrick Sindane MP (Economic Freedom Fighters)
Wayne Thring MP (African Christian Democratic Party)
Vuyolwethu Zungula MP (African Transformation Movement)

References

Committees of the National Assembly of South Africa